ANCAP may refer to:

 ANCAP (commodity standard), based on ammonium nitrate, copper, aluminum and plywood 
 Australasian New Car Assessment Program
 ANCAP (Uruguay), (Administración Nacional de Combustibles, Alcoholes y Portland), a state-owned company
 Ancap, an abbreviation of "anarcho-capitalist"